is  the Head coach of the Aomori Wat's in the Japanese B.League.

Head coaching record

|-
|-
| style="text-align:left;"|Kanazawa Samuraiz
| style="text-align:left;"|2017-18
| 60||28||32|||| style="text-align:center;"|4th in B2 Central|||-||-||-||
| style="text-align:center;"|-
|-
| style="text-align:left;"|Kanazawa Samuraiz
| style="text-align:left;"|2018-19
| 60||21||39|||| style="text-align:center;"|5th in B2 Central|||-||-||-||
| style="text-align:center;"|-
|-
|-

References

1978 births
Living people

Japanese basketball coaches
Hiroshima Dragonflies coaches
Kanazawa Samuraiz coaches
Nagoya Diamond Dolphins players
Niigata Albirex BB coaches
Niigata Albirex BB players 
Rizing Zephyr Fukuoka players
San-en NeoPhoenix players
Yokohama B-Corsairs players